Nguyễn Minh Trí is a futsal player who plays as a pivot (striker) and plays for the team Thái Sơn Nam Futsal Club. He was born on April 8, 1996, in Phuoc Tan Hung city, Long An province. He is the winner of the Vietnam Silver Ball's Futsal title in 2016. He wears the shirt number 8, is a member of the second team of the Vietnam national futsal team. He and his team have been crowned champions 8 times at Vietnam Futsal League.

Playing career 
In 2016, Minh Trí scored a hat-trick in the opening match, helping the Vietnam Futsal team defeat Guatemala in the World Cup 2016. This historic victory helped the Vietnam team go to knockout round in the first time participating.

In 2021, Minh Trí and Vietnam Futsal team participate in the World Cup 2021. Here he had a goal against Panama to become the first Vietnamese player to score in two Futsal World Cup final rounds.

Award 
 Vietnam Futsal Golden Ball 2020.

References

1996 births
Living people
Vietnamese men's futsal players
People from Long An Province